Bradford Township may refer to:
 Bradford Township, Chickasaw County, Iowa
 Bradford Township, Clearfield County, Pennsylvania
 Bradford Township, Isanti County, Minnesota
 Bradford Township, Lee County, Illinois
 Bradford Township, McKean County, Pennsylvania
 Bradford Township, Wilkin County, Minnesota

Township name disambiguation pages